Xanthophyllum nitidum is a tree in the family Polygalaceae. The specific epithet  is from the Latin meaning "shiny", referring to the leaf surfaces.

Description
The bark is black and smooth.

Distribution and habitat
Xanthophyllum nitidum is endemic to Borneo.

References

nitidum
Endemic flora of Borneo
Trees of Borneo
Plants described in 2005